The Church of Fatima, a Roman Catholic church, is located in Bangui, in the Central African Republic. 

It is situated in the neighborhood known as KM5 which is 5 km away from the center of the city.

On May 28, 2014, the Seleka, a paramilitary rebel movement, threw grenades before shooting indiscriminately at the church, killing at least 11 people.

References

Churches in Bangui
Roman Catholic churches in the Central African Republic